BDB may refer to:

 1,3-Benzodioxolylbutanamine (also BDB), an entactogenic drug of the phenethylamine chemical class
 "B D B", the seventh song on Duke Ellington and Count Basie 1961 album First Time! The Count Meets the Duke
 Banc De Binary, an Israeli financial firm with a history of regulatory issues on three continents
 Berkeley DB, a discontinued embedded database software library for key/value data
 Bharat Diamond Bourse, the world's largest diamond bourse
 Big dumb booster, a general class of launch vehicle
 Brown–Driver–Briggs, a standard reference for Biblical Hebrew and Aramaic
 Bundaberg Airport, IATA airport code "BDB"
 , the Association of German Banks in the private sector